Jinks is a surname and occasional given name. Notable people with the name include:

 Catherine Jinks (born 1963), Australian fiction writer
 Cody Jinks (born 1980), American country music singer/songwriter
 Dan Jinks (active 1997 onwards), American film and TV producer
 Derek Jinks, American lawyer  
 Fred Jinks (1880–1940), Australian rules footballer
 Fred Jinks (cricketer) (1909–1996), Australian cricketer
 Jimmy Jinks (1916–1981), English footballer
 John Jinks (politician) (1871–1934), Irish politician
 John L. Jinks (1929–1987), British geneticist
 Mike Jinks (born 1972), American football coach
 Sam Jinks (born 1973) Australian sculptor
 Sue Jinks-Robertson (born 20th century), American professor
 Jinks Coleman (1944–2000), American women's basketball coach